Johann Crotus, or in his native German Johannes Jäger, hence often called Venator, "hunter", but more commonly, in grecized form, crotus, "archer', was a German Humanist. From the name of his birthplace he also received the Latinized appellation Rubianus and is generally known as Crotus Rubianus.

Biography
Johann was born at Dornheim, in Thuringia, c. 1480. At the age of eighteen he went to the University of Erfurt, then the chief centre of German Humanism, where he obtained his baccalaureate degree in 1500.

Friendship with Conrad Mutianus and Ulrich von Hutten led him from being an upholder of Scholasticism to become an enthusiastic partisan of Humanism and a violent opponent of the older learning. In 1505 he induced Ulrich von Hutten to leave the monastery of Fulda, but in 1506 came back with the latter from Cologne to Erfurt, where in 1508 Crotus obtained a degree of Master of Arts. After this he was absent from Erfurt for a short time as tutor to Count von Henneberg, but by 1509 he had again returned to his studies and in 1510 was the head of the abbey school at Fulda. He now formed close relations with Reuchlin and his supporters in Cologne; about 1514 he was for a short time in Cologne, but soon returned to Fulda where he was ordained priest and obtained a small benefice.

About 1515 he wrote the larger part of the Epistolæ Obscurorum Virorum; the 'letters of obscure men' composed by him are the most violent in character, full of venom and stinging scorn against Scholasticism and monasticism. In 1517 he settled in Bologna as tutor of the Fuchs brothers, and during his stay at this city, up to 1519, he studied successively jurisprudence and theology. Before leaving Italy he went in company with Eoban Hesse to Rome (1519) in order to observe for himself the "see of corruption". While in Bologna he had become acquainted with Martin Luther's writings and actions, learned of the violent stand he had taken and approved it as the beginning of a greatly needed reform of the Church; apparently also he had a share in the anonymous broadsides which appeared in Germany.

From 1520 he was again in Erfurt where he was made rector of the university, and here in 1521 he gave Luther a warm greeting when the latter passed through Erfurt on his way to Worms. Soon after this Crotus returned to Fulda, where Philip Melanchthon visited him in 1524. In the same year Crotus entered the service of Albert, Duke of Prussia, at Königsberg and endeavoured to justify the duke's withdrawal from the Catholic Faith in a pamphlet directed against the new master of the Teutonic Order entitled "Christliche Vermahnung" 'Chriastian warning' (1526).

Weary of his position at Königsberg as early as 1529, he went first, in 1530, to Leipzig, and soon afterwards to Halle; here Crotus accepted service under Cardinal Albrecht of Brandenburg as councillor and received a canonry. As a genuine Humanist, Crotus had for a long time felt disgusted with the public disturbance and bitter polemics that resulted from the Lutheran movement; he was still more dissatisfied with the grave disorder in morals and religion. Thus in Halle, probably through the influence of its canons, he positively returned to Catholicism, which he seems, however, never to have abandoned consciously.

The first clear notice of this change of views is the "Apologia, qua respondetur temeritati calumniatorum non verentium confictis criminibus in populare odium protrahere reverendissimum in Christo patrem et dominum Albertum". (Leipzig, 1531). The "Apologia" contained a positive denial of the accusations made by Alexander Crosner or Luther that Cardinal Albrecht, in the persecution of the new doctrine and in his opposition to granting the cup to the laity, had acted with extreme cruelty and lack of consideration. Crotus showed that the Reformation had resulted in the sanctioning of all kinds of immorality and blasphemy, and that where the "Antipopes" ruled, those of other beliefs were cruelly oppressed, denounced by spies and persecuted. Various pamphlets, chiefly anonymous, were issued in reply to the "Apologia" and the author was violently attacked by Justus Jonas and other of his former friends. After this Luther always gave the name of Dr. Kröte (toad) to his one-time adherent, the dreaded opponent in former days of Scholasticism and monasticism. Suspicion was often thrown on the motives for the inner change in Crotus. His connexion with the Catholic Church was attributed to desire for princely favour and greed of gain. But there can be no doubt that his resolution was deliberate and that he belonged to Luther's party only so long as he hoped in this way to attain a reform of the Church.

As soon as there was a formal break with the Church and the pretended reform movement produced only anarchy in religion and morals, he turned his back on it without giving a thought to the hatred of his friends of earlier days. In a letter dated 1532 to Duke Albrecht, he states his religious views clearly: "with the help of God he intends to remain in communion with the Church and allow all innovations to pass over like a disagreeable smoke".

Crotus appears to have spent the last years of his life entirely at Halle, but nothing positive is known on the subject. Most probably Georg Witzel urged him at different times to write again in defence of the Catholic Church, and he seems, indeed, to have made an effort to do this. But afterwards we hear that the position, "unworthy of a man", in which he was placed, did not permit him to take up his pen on behalf of religion. It is not entirely certain whether his canonry or his character of official in the service of Cardinal Albrecht laid these limitations on him. Yet he apparently had an important influence on the writings of others as, e.g. on those of Witzel. He died probably at Halle, c. 1539

Crotus himself as a humanist of strong intellectual tastes, preferred above all the quiet of his study. It may be that the revolutionary tumult in religious and social life took from him both the desire and the strength to use the pen which had formerly so unmercifully scourged the weaknesses of his opponents. He seems, however, to have influenced the religious demeanour of his master, Cardinal Albrecht, in the cardinal's later years.

The last scanty information concerning Crotus reaches to the year 1539; his death occurred, if not in this year, then certainly not much later.

Sources
 Catholic Encyclopedia article

1480 births
1539 deaths

German Renaissance humanists
People from Ilm-Kreis
University of Erfurt alumni
German male writers